Hud, is the 11th chapter (Surah) of the Quran and has 123 verses (ayat). It relates in part to the prophet Hud. Regarding the timing and contextual background of the revelation (asbāb al-nuzūl), it is an earlier "Meccan surah", which means it is believed to have been revealed in Mecca, instead of later in Medina.

Verses 105-112 are preserved in the Ṣan‘ā’1 lower text.

Summary

1-2 The Quran a revelation from God
3-5 Muhammad a warner and a preacher of goodness
6  Infidels cannot hide their sin from God
7-8  God the Creator and Preserver of all creatures
8  The resurrection rejected by the infidels as sorcery
9  They scoff at threatened punishment
10-11  Mercy and judgment alike disregarded by infidels
12  Those who persevere in good works shall be rewarded
13  The unbelievers demand a sign from heaven
14  Muhammad charged with forging the Qurán
14-15  He challenges the infidels to produce ten chapters like it, or to become Muslims
16-17  The miserable fate of those who live for this present world
18  Moses and the Jews attest the truth of the Qurán
19-23  The maligners of prophets shall be cursed
24  The blessed portion of believers
25  Comparison of believers and nonbelievers

The History of Noah 26-27 He is sent as a public preacher 28 The chiefs of his people reject him as a liar 29-32 Noah protests his integrity - Refuses to drive away his poor followers - Deprecates being thought a seer or an angel 33 His people challenge him to bring on the threatened judgment 34-35 Noah declares that God destroys and saves whom he pleaseth 36 Noah's people declare his message a forgery 37 God tells Noah that no more of his people will believe on him 38 He is commanded to make an ark 39 Noah builds the ark and is derided by the people 40-41 Embarks with his followers and one pair each of the animals 42-43 Noah in vain entreats his unbelieving son to embark 44 The waters abate and the ark rests on Al Júdi 45 Noah pleads with God for his son 46 God reproves him for his intercession for his son 47 Noah repents and asks pardon for his fault 48 He descends from the ark 49 This history a secret revealed to Muhammad

The History of Hūd 50-52 He is sent to call Ád from idolatry 53 The Ádites reject him as a liar  54-57 Hūd protests his integrity, and declares his trust in God to save him from their plots 58 God delivers Hūd and his followers 59-60 The Ádites reject their messenger and are destroyed

The History of Sálih 61 He is sent to call the Thamúdites from idolatry 62 They reject his message 63-64 Sálih protests his integrity, and gives them a she-camel as a sign from God 65 They kill the camel, and are threatened with destruction 66 Sálih and his followers are saved from destruction 67-68 The Thamúdites are miserably destroyed

The History of Abraham and Lot 69 God's messengers sent to Abraham—He entertains them 70  He is filled with fear because they refuse to eat his meat 70-71  The angels quiet his fears and tell him they are sent to the people of Lot 71-73 Sarah receives the promise of Isaac and Jacob 74  Abraham intercedes for the people of Lot 75  The angels refuse his request 76  Lot is anxious for the safety of his angel visitors 77-79  The Sodomites attack his house 80  The angels warn Lot to leave the city and inform him of the destruction impending over his people and his wife 81-82 The cities are overthrown and the people killed by a shower of bricks

The History of Shuaib 83 He is sent to call the Midianites from idolatry 84-86 He reproaches them for dishonest weights and measures 87 The people reject him, refusing to leave their idols 88-90 Shuaib protests his integrity, and exhorts them to flee the fate of the people of Noah, Hūd, Sálih, and Lot 91 The people threaten to stone him 92-94 Shuaib threatens them with Divine judgment 95-96 God destroys the infidels, but saves Shuaib and his followers

The History of Moses 97 He is sent with signs to Pharaoh and his princes 98-100 They reject him, and are consigned to hell-fire 101-105 Exhortation and warning drawn from the fate of these cities 106-109 The condition of the righteous and wicked in judgment 110 Muhammad not to doubt about the religion of the Quarish

111 The Quraish doubt the Quran as the Jews did the Pentateuch 112 God will punish their evil deeds 
113-114 Muhammad exhorted to be steadfast 
115 An exhortation to prayer
116-118 God just in destroying the unbelieving cities 
119 The unbelievers predestinated to damnation 
120 The whole history of the prophets related to Muhammad 
121-122 Unbelievers threatened 
123 Muhammad exhorted to put his trust in God

Exegesis

Quran 11 opens with a discussion on the nature of man and the punishment that awaits those who defy God. Thereafter, the main content of the surah is a series of stories of prophets who warned their people to follow God, the people persisting in defying God, and God punishing and killing them.

25-49 The story of Noah
Verses 11:25-49 tell the story of Noah and how his people did not believe his commands to follow God. The unbelievers are drowned in a flood, which includes Noah's son; Noah asks God about this act, but God rebukes Noah as being ignorant and says that Noah's son is "not a member of his family." Surah 66, At-Tahrim, elaborates on this and says that Noah's wife is an unbeliever in hell who was unfaithful to her husband.

50-60 The prophet Hud is sent to the ʿĀd
Verses 11:50-60 deal with the prophet Hud, the namesake of the Surah. He was sent to the ʿĀd, an Omani tribe which according to history crumbled sometime between the 3rd and 6th century AD. The ʿĀd do not believe Hud, and Hud and those who do believe are rescued by God, followed by God inflicting a "dreadful doom" on them so that they were "accursed in the world."

61-68 The people of Thamud and the prophet Saleh
Verses 11:61-68 concern the people of Thamud and the prophet Saleh. Saleh tries to convince Thamud to repent, but once more the unbelievers ignore the prophet. Saleh offers a she-camel as an offering of peace, but says that it should be left alone. If anything befalls it, the people will be punished. The camel is hamstrung, Saleh and those who believe are rescued, and the unbelievers are smitten by a "blast from heaven."

69-84 Sodom and Gomorrah 
The Quranic version of the Biblical story of Sodom and Gomorrah is in Verses 11:69-84. Abraham and Sarah are given the news of their son and grandson's forthcoming birth (Isaac and Jacob), after which they plead for mercy for Lot's people. God refuses the request, saying that the punishment cannot be averted. Lot offers his daughters( for marriage )to the men of Sodom, but they respond with disinterest and say "you know what we want."

80-84 Homosexuality
Verses 11:80-84 confirms the Biblical account of homosexuality as being the crime of Lot's people. Angels descend to protect Lot and his daughters, and the city is destroyed by a stone rain. Lot's wife perishes as well.

85-95 The prophet Shu'aib sent to Midian
Verse 11:85-95 deal with the prophet Shu'aib sent to Midian. Once more, the people ignore the prophet's warnings; this time, Shu'aib reminds the people of the fate of the people of Noah, Hud, Saleh, and Lot. It doesn't work, and the people spare Shu'aib from death by stoning only because he comes from a powerful clan. Shu'aib and those who believe are rescued by God. Afterward, the unbelievers "[were] seized by a punishment from heaven, and lay overturned in their homes in the morning as though they had not dwelt there at all."

The remaining verses discuss the general theme once more, with occasional references to Moses. The harsh punishment is explained as "We did not wrong them; they wronged themselves." Other gods are decried as false, powerless, and useless. Believers are commanded to walk the straight path and follow God, and those who disbelieve will suffer in Hell.

References

External links 
Q11:1, 50+ translations, islamawakened.com
Quran 11 Clear Quran translation 
Surah Hud Mp4

Hud